Quebec's system of college education results in multiple types college degrees with diplomas. In the CEGEP-era, pre-university programs result in "diplomas", as do technical studies that result in associate degree analogues, while the vocational programs result in "attestations".

CEGEP-era
 Quebec Diploma of College Studies (English: DCS; French: Diplôme d'études collégiales, DEC) for preuniversity studies, equivalent to a junior college prep school
 Quebec Diploma of College Studies (English: DCS; French: Diplôme d'études collégiales, DEC) for technical studies, analogue to a university college associate's degree
 Quebec Attestation of College Studies (English: ACS; French: Attestation d'études collégiales, AEC) for vocational studies, like the trade school community college

See also
 High school diploma
 Associate's degree
 College degree

Education in Quebec
Quebec CEGEP
Universities and colleges in Quebec